The House Jacks is a professional a cappella quintet from San Francisco, founded in 1991 by Deke Sharon.

The House Jacks describe themselves as a "rock band without instruments", their live shows typically include not only singing but also vocally imitating instruments such as trumpets, guitars, harmonicas and strings as well as taking audience-requests for songs and rendering them in musical styles unlike the original versions.

The group primarily performs original material (unlike most contemporary a cappella groups who focus on cover songs) and is considered the first professional a cappella group to have a dedicated vocal percussionist.

The group routinely tours the United States, Europe and Asia, has recorded numerous jingles and has garnered numerous recording and community awards (see below). The group was signed to Tommy Boy records (then a part of Warner Brothers) from 1994-1997, and Artilier Records (Germany) from 2000-2005.

They can be heard in the background music on NBC's The Sing-Off in the opening video, commercial transitions and elimination sequences. They have also created comedic bits and jingles for the radio personalities Mancow Muller and Rick Dees.

The group performed at the 53rd Monterey Jazz Festival on September 17, 2010. and have performed on stages from Carnegie Hall to the Gewandhaus.

They performed the Monday Night Football Theme "Are You Ready For Some Football" with Hank Williams, Jr. for the 2011 season.

Rolling Stone wrote about their inclusion in Ford automobiles, demoing the twelve speaker Sony sound system 

Their version of "Since U Been Gone" was adapted for the audition scene in Pitch Perfect (Deke Sharon was on site music director, arranger and vocal producer for the film, as well as "Male Voice #1")

Member changes 
The original group of seven members met while singing in collegiate groups on the East Coast (Tufts Beelzebubs, Brown Jabberwocks, UNC Clef Hangers, The Dartmouth Aires) and relocated to San Francisco to begin the group in September 1991.
Past members include Kid Beyond, Rob Penn, Garth Kravits, Bert Bacco, Wes Carroll, and Antonio Medrano.

Band Lineups 
Present
Mark Joseph: vocals
John Pointer: vocals, Beatboxing, instrument mimicry
Nick Girard: Vocal percussion, vocals, vocal bass
Austin Willacy: vocals
Gregory Fletcher: vocal bass, vocals

2015-2017
Nick Girard: Vocal percussion, vocals, vocal bass
Matt Sallee: vocal bass, vocals
Mark Joseph: vocals
John Pointer: vocals, Beatboxing, instrument mimicry
Austin Willacy: vocals

2012-2015
Deke Sharon: vocals, instrument mimicry
Austin Willacy: vocals
John Pointer: vocals, beatboxing, instrument mimicry
Elliot Robinson: vocal bass, vocals
Nick Girard: vocal percussion, vocals, vocal bass

2010-2012
Deke Sharon: vocals, instrument mimicry
Austin Willacy: vocals
Roopak Ahuja: vocal, instrument mimicry
Troy Horne: vocal bass, vocals
Jake Moulton: vocal percussion, beatboxing, instrument mimicry

2008-2010
Deke Sharon: vocals, instrument mimicry
Austin Willacy: vocals
Roopak Ahuja: vocal, instrument mimicry
Antonio Medrano: vocal bass, vocals
Jake Moulton: vocal percussion, beatboxing, instrument mimicry

2006-2008
Deke Sharon: vocals, instrument mimicry
Austin Willacy: vocals
Roopak Ahuja: vocal, instrument mimicry
Antonio Medrano: vocal bass, vocals
Wes Carroll: vocal percussion, vocals

1998-2006
Deke Sharon: vocals, instrument mimicry
Austin Willacy: vocals
Garth Kravits: vocals
Bert Bacco: vocal bass, vocals
Wes Carroll: vocal percussion, vocals

1993-1998
Deke Sharon: vocals, instrument mimicry
Rob Penn: vocals
Austin Willacy: vocals
Tristan Bishop: vocals
Bert Bacco: vocal bass, vocals
Andrew Chaikin: vocal percussion

1992-1993
Deke Sharon: vocals, instrument mimicry
Rob Penn: vocals
Tristan Bishop: vocals
Bert Bacco: vocal bass, vocals
Andrew Chaikin: vocal percussion
Marty Mahoney: vocals

1991-1992
Deke Sharon: vocals, instrument mimicry
Rob Penn: vocals
Tristan Bishop: vocals
Bert Bacco: vocal bass, vocals
Andrew Chaikin: vocal percussion
Marty Mahoney: vocals
Brannon Wiles: vocals

Timeline

Discography

Awards 
Contemporary A Cappella Recording Awards (CARAs)
2004
Best Pop/Rock Album: Unbroken
Best Best Pop/Rock Original Song: "Good Things" from Unbroken
2006
Best Original Song: "This Man's Pride" from "Fitchy & Grikko"
2007
Runner Up, Best Pop/Rock Album: Get Down Mr. President!!
2011
Best Pop/Rock Album: Level
Best Pop/Rock Original Song: "Red Dress" from Level
Best Professional Original Song: "You Were Everything" from Level
2015
Best Pop/Rock Album: Pollen
Best Original Song by a Professional Group: "Talk2Me" from Pollen
Runner Up: Best Pop/Rock Song: "As It Falls Apart" from Pollen
Runner Up: Best HipHop/R&B Song: "Talk2Me" from Pollen
A Cappella Community Awards (ACAs)
2010
Favorite Vocal Percussionist: Jake Moulton
Favorite Songwriter: Austin Willacy
Favorite Arranger: Deke Sharon
Favorite Moment: Jake Moulton's turntables from House Jacks SoJam performance
2011
Favorite Professional Album: Level
Favorite Male Vocalist: Roopak Ahuja (runner up)
Favorite Vocal Percussionist: Jake Moulton
Favorite Songwriter: Austin Willacy 
Favorite Song That Doesn't Sound A Cappella: "You Were Everything" from Level
Favorite Original Song: "Red Dress" from Level
Favorite Album Art: Level

Footnotes

External links 
 
Facebook fan page
Group Twitter

Professional a cappella groups
Musical quintets
Musical groups from San Francisco
Musical groups established in 1991
1991 establishments in California